Melin Llynon, or Llynon Mill, is a gristmill located on the outskirts of the village of Llanddeusant on the island of Anglesey. It is the only surviving working windmill in Wales.

The mill was built for £529, 11s in 1775–1776, on land owned by the surgeon Herbert Jones.  It is classified as a tower mill. The machinery is within a stone tower and the moving top, or cap cwch, turns so that the sails hwyliau catch the wind from any direction.  The tower was 9.3 metres tall and with four floors.  It was used to drive machines for grinding corn, oats and barley. The first miller, Thomas Jones (1756–1846), worked it until his death.  The position of miller was passed down through the generations, eventually going to a cousin William Pritchard.

A storm in 1918 damaged the cap stopping it turning to face the wind.  It still operated intermittently for the next six years when the wind was from the south-west. Eventually the mill closed and became increasingly dilapidated. It remained deserted and unused until the local council restored it between 1978 and 1986.  It reopened in 1986 and now produces stoneground flour.

References

 Anglesey Today: Llynnon Mill, Llanddeusant, Anglesey

External links 
 
 Photos of Llynnon Mill and surrounding area on geograph.org.uk

Windmills completed in 1775
Windmills in Anglesey
Tourist attractions in Anglesey
Museums in Anglesey
Mill museums in Wales
Tref Alaw
Grade II* listed buildings in Anglesey
Grade II* listed windmills